Almelo is a railway station in Almelo, Netherlands. The station was opened on 18 October 1865 and is on the Deventer–Almelo railway, Almelo–Salzbergen railway, Zwolle–Almelo railway and Mariënberg–Almelo railway lines. The current station building dates from 1962. The train services are operated by Nederlandse Spoorwegen and Arriva.

Train services
, the following train services call at this station:
1× per 2 hours express Intercity service: Amsterdam - Amersfoort - Hengelo - Osnabrück - Hanover - Berlin
1× per hour express Intercity service: Schiphol - Amersfoort - Hengelo - Enschede
1× per hour express Intercity service: The Hague - Utrecht - Amersfoort - Hengelo - Enschede
2× per hour local Sprinter service: Apeldoorn - Deventer - Almelo (- Hengelo - Enschede) (1x per hour in evening and weekend; to Enschede during peak hours only)
2× per hour local Sprinter service: Zwolle - Almelo - Hengelo - Enschede
1× per hour local Stoptrein service: Almelo - Hardenberg (2× per hour during peak hours)

Bus services
 21 Syntus Station - Hospital - Windmolenbroek - Station (Almelo South)
 22 Syntus Station - Windmolenbroek - Hospital - Station (Almelo South)
 23 Syntus Station - Schelfhorst - Sluitersveld - Station (Almelo North)
 24 Syntus Station - Sluitersveld - Schelfhorst - Station (Almelo North)
 25 Syntus Station - Aalderinkshoek (Almelo West)
 26 Syntus Station - Twenteborg Hospital (Almelo South)
 51 Syntus Vriezenveen - Almelo - Borne - Hengelo
 64 Syntus Almelo - Harbrinkhoek - Geesteren - Tubbergen - Vasse - Ootmarssum - Rossum - Oldenzaal - Losser - Overdinkel
 66 Syntus Neede - Delden - Almelo - Almelo north-east - Albergen - Fleringen - Weerselo - Lemselo - Oldenzaal
 80 Syntus Holten - Markelo - Goor - Rijssen - Wierden - Almelo - Westhaar - Kloosterhaar - Bergentheim - Hardenberg

Gallery

References

External links

NS
Syntus
Dutch public transport travel planner

Railway stations in Overijssel
Railway stations in Germany opened in 1865
Railway stations on the Almelo - Salzbergen railway line
Almelo